Eneby BK is a Swedish football club located in Norrköping.

Background
Eneby BK currently plays in Division 3 nordöstra Götaland, which is the fifth tier of Swedish football. They play their home matches at the Maxivallen in Norrköping.

Eneby BK are affiliated to Östergötlands Fotbollförbund. Eneby BK played in the 2006 Svenska Cupen but lost 1–5 at home to Enskede IK in the first round.

Season to season

Attendances

In recent seasons Eneby BK have had the following average attendances:

Footnotes

External links
 Eneby BK – Official website
 Eneby BK Norrköping on Facebook

Football clubs in Östergötland County